Tamsica hyacinthina is a moth of the family Crambidae. It is endemic to the Hawaiian islands of Oahu and Hawaii.

External links

Diptychophorini
Endemic moths of Hawaii